John Samuel "Sam" Marty (born November 8, 1947) is an American politician. He has served as a Republican member for the 28th district in the South Dakota House of Representatives since 2015.

References

1947 births
Living people
Educators from South Dakota
Republican Party members of the South Dakota House of Representatives
21st-century American politicians